Tonna ampullacea is a species of large sea snail, a marine gastropod mollusk in the family Tonnidae, the tun shells.

Description

Distribution

References

External links
 

Tonnidae
Gastropods described in 1845